Bülent Korkmaz (born March 5, 1975) is a Turkish Paralympian archer competing in the Men's compound bow event.

Early life 
Bülent Korkmaz was born on March 5, 1975. He lives in Biga town of Çanakkale Province, where he is employed by the municipality.

Sporting career 
Korkmaz won with the national team a silver medal at the 2014 European Para Archery Championships in Nottwil, Switzerland, a silver medal at the 2015 World Para Archery Championships in Donaueschingen, Germany, and a gold medal at the 2016 European Para Archery Championships in Saint-Jean-de-Monts, France.

He obtained a quota spot for the 2016 Summer Paralympics in Rio de Janeiro, Brazil. He won the silver medal with his teammate Öznur Cüre in the Mixed team compound event at the Archery at the 2020 Summer Paralympics.

References 

1975 births
People from Biga, Çanakkale
Turkish male archers
Paralympic archers of Turkey
Wheelchair category Paralympic competitors
Archers at the 2016 Summer Paralympics
Living people
Paralympic silver medalists for Turkey
Medalists at the 2020 Summer Paralympics
Paralympic medalists in archery
Islamic Solidarity Games medalists in archery
21st-century Turkish people